Protosticta mortoni, is a damselfly species in the family Platystictidae. It is endemic to Western Ghats in India.

Description and habitat
It is a large slender damselfly with black capped ultramarine blue eyes. Its prothorax is blue with posterior lobe black. Its thorax is glossy black, marked with two  narrow blue lateral stripes on each side. There is a similar stripe on the posterior part of metepimeron. Abdomen is black, marked with white and blue. Sides of segment 1 is blue; 2 is white. Segment 3 is with a narrow basal annule. Segments 4 to 7 are with broad basal annules. Segment 8 is with its basal half turquoise-blue, extending along sides nearly as far as apex, and separated from the base of segment by a very narrow black basal ring. Segments 9 and 10 are unmarked. Anal appendages are black. Female is very similar to the male, but shorter and more robustly built.

It is similar to Protosticta gravelyi, but can be distinguished by the prothorax blue with its posterior lobe black
and by the markings on segment 8, the basal half of dorsum being unmarked.

See also 
 List of odonates of India
 List of odonata of Kerala

References

External links

Platystictidae
Insects of India
Insects described in 1924